Mönchgut is a municipality in the district of Vorpommern-Rügen, in Mecklenburg-Vorpommern, Germany. It was created with effect from 1 January 2018 by the merger of the former municipalities of Gager, Middelhagen and Thiessow. Its name derives from the Mönchgut peninsula.

References

Towns and villages on Rügen
Mönchgut